Assistant divisional officer (ADO) was formerly a rank used by fire brigades in the United Kingdom. The rank was replaced in most fire and rescue services with the role of station manager or station commander, depending on the service.

Fire and rescue service organisation in the United Kingdom